Buzz TV was an Irish user-generated television channel that was launched in June 2008, it closed 2 years later in July 2010. The channel allowed viewers to upload their own content, as well as focusing on independent productions, and broadcast on cable and Internet Protocol TV. It was only available on Irish cable provider UPC, on their digital service, channel 131 (their sister service was available on 132).

Viewers could text in comments during various programmes, voting for music video of the week, or even use the channel as a social network to chat to the presenter or other viewers. The channel also aired other material such as independent artists' music videos, comedy sketches, and short films.

Background
Buzz TV was officially available throughout Ireland to 380,000 households on UPC Ireland. On 10 July 2010 both it and its sister channel Smile TV were removed from UPC EPG while the website www.buzztv.ie was removed from the internet.

Programmes
Fashion TV
Music Festival Diary
MTV The Festival Show
Gillette World Sports
Curb Surfers
Sumo TV Ireland
Irish Whip Wrestling
Film Seasons
Cartoons

See also
Media of the Republic of Ireland
List of Irish television channels

References

Television stations in Ireland
Mass media companies of Ireland
Television channels and stations established in 1998

fi:Buzz